Shallow is the debut LP by Pissed Jeans. Released in 2005, the album features elements of noise rock and hardcore punk. The album can be described what "sounds like a big pile of mud and broken glass ripping through your stereo speakers in the most killer way imaginable."

Track listing

Notes 

2005 debut albums
Pissed Jeans albums